The UK Singles Chart is one of many music charts compiled by the Official Charts Company that calculates the best-selling singles of the week in the United Kingdom. Before 2004, the chart was only based on the sales of physical singles. This list shows singles that peaked in the Top 10 of the UK Singles Chart during 1989, as well as singles which peaked in 1988 but were in the top 10 in 1989. The entry date is when the single appeared in the top 10 for the first time (week ending, as published by the Official Charts Company, which is six days after the chart is announced).

One-hundred and forty-five singles were in the top ten in 1989. Nine singles from 1988 remained in the top 10 for several weeks at the beginning of the year. "Buffalo Stance" by Neneh Cherry, "Crackers International (EP)" by Erasure, "Good Life" by Inner City, "Especially for You" by Kylie and Jason and "Loco in Acapulco" by Four Tops were the singles from 1988 to reach their peak in 1989. Forty-seven artists scored multiple entries in the top 10 in 1989. The Beautiful South, Guns N' Roses, Michael Ball, New Kids on the Block and Stone Roses were among the many artists who achieved their first UK charting top 10 single in 1989.

The first number-one single of the year was "Especially for You" by Kylie Minogue and Jason Donovan. Overall, eighteen different singles peaked at number-one in 1989, with Jason Donovan (4, including his Band Aid II participation) having the most singles hit that position.

Background

Multiple entries
One-hundred and forty-five singles charted in the top 10 in 1989, with one-hundred and forty-one singles reaching their peak this year.

Forty-seven artists scored multiple entries in the top 10 in 1989. Australian singer Jason Donovan secured the record for the most top 10 hits in 1989 with six hit singles. "Too Many Broken Hearts" reached number-one, where it remained for two weeks, and a further five weeks in the top ten. Similarly "Sealed with a Kiss" had two weeks at the summit, and four weeks in the top ten in total. Donovan had a third number one single, his collaboration with Neighbours co-star Kylie Minogue, "Especially for You" taking the honours for three weeks, and staying in the top ten for 10 weeks. Other entries included "Every Day (I Love You More)" and "When You Come Back to Me" (both number 2). Donovan was also a participant on the Band Aid II charity single "Do They Know It's Christmas", which was also a chart-topper in December 1989.

Alongside her guest spot on the band aid single and duet with Donovan, Kylie Minogue had three further high charting entries in her own right. "Hand on Your Heart" was a number-one hit, "Wouldn't Change a Thing" just missed out but reached number two, and "Never Too Late" was another top five single, peaking at number 4. British trio Bros had four top tens to their name in 1989, not including vocal and instrumental credit for band members Luke and Matt Goss with Band Aid II. Christmas double single "Cat Among the Pigeons"/"Silent Night" carried over to January and "Too Much" (number 2), "Chocolate Box" (9) and "Sister" (10) were all top ten hits.

Cliff Richard and Madonna both had four top-ten entries, the latter's biggest hit being, "Like a Prayer", which topped the chart, and the former's festive hit "Mistletoe and Wine" sticking around for the early part of the year. Big Fun members Jason Herbert, Mark Gillespie and Phil Creswick, Bobby Brown, Caron Wheeler, Guns N' Roses, Holly Johnson, Jive Bunny and the Mastermixers and Soul II Soul were the other artists who all had three top 10 singles in 1989.

Lisa Stansfield was one of a number of artists with two top-ten entries, including the number-one single "All Around the World". The Beautiful South, Donna Summer, Inner City, Neneh Cherry and Tina Turner were among the other artists who had multiple top 10 entries in 1989.

Chart debuts
Fifty-eight artists achieved their first top 10 single in 1989, either as a lead or featured artist. Of these, nine went on to record another hit single that year: The Beautiful South, Big Fun (band), Caron Wheeler, Chris Rea, Lisa Stansfield, London Boys, Martika, Sonia and Technotronic. Guns N' Roses, Jive Bunny and the Mastermixers and Soul II Soul all had two other entries in their breakthrough year.

The following table (collapsed on desktop site) does not include acts who had previously charted as part of a group and secured their first top 10 solo single.

Notes
Holly Johnson scored a succession of hit singles in the line-up of Frankie Goes to Hollywood, and was also part of the original Band Aid single in 1984. However, 1989's "Love Train" from his debut solo album, Blast, became his first solo top 10. Robert Howard from The Blow Monkeys duetted with solo artist Kym Mazelle on "Wait!", reaching number 8 and becoming his first single to reach the top 10 without his band.

Bobby Brown performed with the group New Edition from 1978 to 1985, notably topping the chart with "Candy Girl" in 1983. He went it alone this year with three top 10 hits, including "My Prerogative" peaking at number six. Gerry Marsden headed up Gerry and the Pacemakers and contributed to the "Ferry Cross the Mersey" charity single in 1989. Gladys Knight, formerly of Gladys Knight & The Pips, had her only top 10 solo single, the theme song to the James Bond film Licence to Kill.

Bette Midler first entered the chart as a participant on 1985's "We Are the World" in the supergroup USA for Africa. However signature song "Wind Beneath My Wings" was her first official entry on her own. Members of Black Box also charted under several other aliases in 1989, including Starlight and Mixmaster who are both credited as separate acts.

Band Aid II consisted of many artists who had previously charted as solo artists, namely Chris Rea, Cliff Richard, D Mob, Jason Donovan, Kylie Minogue, Lisa Stansfield, Sonia and Technotronic. Musicians with chart credits as part of a group included Sara Dallin, Siobhan Fahey and Keren Woodward (Bananarama, also on the original Band Aid), Phil Creswick, Mark Gillespie and Jason John (Big Fun), Luke Goss and Matt Goss (Bros), Kevin Godley (10CC and Godley and Creme), Jimmy Somerville (Communards and Bronski Beat), Andrew Banfield, Aaron Brown, David Milliner, Michael Milliner and Hamish Seelochan (The Pasadenas), Mike Stock and Matt Aitken (Stock Aitken Waterman) and Graeme Clark, Tommy Cunningham, Neil Mitchell and Marti Pellow (Wet Wet Wet). Cathy Dennis and Glen Goldsmith both reached the top 10 for the first time with the Band Aid II record.

Songs from films
Original songs from various films entered the top 10 throughout the year.  These included "Waiting for a Star to Fall" (from Three Men and a Little Lady),  "Leave Me Alone" (Moonwalker),  "Batdance" (Batman), "Licence to Kill" (Licence to Kill), "Wind Beneath My Wings" (Beaches), "On Our Own" (Ghostbusters II) and "You Got It (The Right Stuff)" (The Wizard).

Charity singles
A couple of songs recorded for charity reached the top 10 in 1989. The single "Ferry Cross the Mersey" saw The Christians, Gerry Marsden, Holly Johnson, Paul McCartney, Stock Aitken Waterman uniting as a tribute to victims of the Hillsborough Disaster where 96 football fans ultimately lost their lives. The single was a chart-topper for 3 weeks from 20 May 1989 (week ending).

For the second time, a set of music stars formed the supergroup Band Aid II and released the single "Do They Know It's Christmas?" to continue support for ongoing famine in Ethiopia. The song featured artists including Kylie Minogue, Sonia, Luke and Matt Goss and Cliff Richard. It was the Christmas number-one single for 1989, topping the chart for three weeks from 23 December 1989 (week ending).

Best-selling singles
Black Box had the best-selling single of the year with "Ride On Time", which spent 11 weeks in the top 10, including 6 weeks at the top spot, sold 850,000 copies and was certified platinum by the BPI. "Swing the Mood" by Jive Bunny and the Mastermixers came in second place, selling 820,000 copies and losing out by 30,000 sales. The Bangles' "Eternal Flame", "Too Many Broken Hearts" from Jason Donovan and "Back to Life (However Do You Want Me)" by Soul II Soul featuring Caron Wheeler made up the top five. Singles by Marc Almond featuring Gene Pitney, Jive Bunny and the Mastermixers ("That's What I Like"), Technotronic featuring Felly, Band Aid II and Kylie Minogue were also in the top ten best-selling singles of the year.

Top-ten singles
Key

Entries by artist

The following table shows artists who achieved two or more top 10 entries in 1989, including singles that reached their peak in 1988. The figures include both main artists and featured artists, while appearances on ensemble charity records are also counted for each artist.

Notes

 Caron Wheeler was credited as a featured artist on the Soul II Soul songs "Back to Life (However Do You Want Me)" and "Keep on Movin'", and a main artist on "Get a Life".
 Mixmaster and Starlight were two aliases used by members of Black Box but are counted as separate acts.
 "Love Changes Everything" is a song from the Andrew Lloyd Webber stage musical Aspects of Love.
 Lananeeneenoonoo's name was a parody of Bananarama. The group's lineup included comedians Dawn French, Jennifer Saunders and Kathy Burke.
 Released as a charity single to support families of victims of the Hillsborough Disaster.
 "On the Inside" was the theme song to the Australian television series Prisoner: Cell Block H.
 "You Got It (The Right Stuff)" re-entered the top 10 at number 10 on 6 January 1990 (week ending).
 Released as a charity single by Band Aid to aid the continuing efforts towards famine relief in Ethiopia.
 Figure includes single that first charted in 1988 but peaked in 1989.
 Figure includes an appearance on the "Do They Know It's Christmas?" charity single by Band Aid II.
 Figure includes four top 10 hits with the group Bros.
 Figure includes single that peaked in 1988.
 Figure includes an appearance on the "Ferry Cross the Mersey" charity single.
 Figure includes two top 10 hits with the group Big Fun.
 Figure includes a top 10 hit with the group Wet Wet Wet. 
 Figure includes a top 10 hit with the group Bananarama.

See also
1989 in British music
List of number-one singles from the 1980s (UK)

References
General

Specific

External links
1989 singles chart archive at the Official Charts Company (click on relevant week)
Official Top 40 best-selling songs of 1989 at the Official Charts Company

United Kingdom
Top 10 singles
1989